Woody Harrelson is an American actor and playwright. He first became known for his role as bartender Woody Boyd on the NBC sitcom Cheers (1985–1993), for which he won a Primetime Emmy Award for Outstanding Supporting Actor in a Comedy Series from a total of five nominations. He has also received three Academy Award nominations: Best Actor for The People vs. Larry Flynt (1996) and Best Supporting Actor for The Messenger (2009) and Three Billboards Outside Ebbing, Missouri (2017).

Major Associations

Academy Awards

BAFTA Awards

Emmy Awards

Golden Globe Awards

Screen Actors Guild Awards

Miscellaneous awards

See also
 Woody Harrelson filmography

References

Harrelson, Woody